Erskine College is a private Christian college in Due West, South Carolina. It is an undergraduate liberal arts college and a graduate theological seminary. The college was founded in 1839 by the Associate Reformed Presbyterian Church. Its sports teams compete in NCAA Division II as a member of Conference Carolinas.

History
Erskine College was founded by the Associate Reformed Presbyterian Church in 1839. Prior to this time the church had established an academy for men in Due West, S.C., in 1835, and a seminary in 1837. The academy became Erskine College, the first four-year church-related college in South Carolina. It was named for Ebenezer Erskine, a pastor and one of the founders of one of the antecedent bodies of the Associate Reformed Presbyterian Church. Erskine had led a group of separatists from the Church of Scotland to found an Associate Presbytery.

Erskine began to admit women in 1894 and officially became coeducational in 1899. In 1927, it merged with Due West Female College, founded in 1859. In 1929, Bryson College closed and merged with Erskine College.

A planned merger of the college, the seminary, and the Due West Woman’s College paved the way for accreditation by the Southern Association of Colleges in 1925. By 1927 the three schools had merged into one institution called Erskine College, with the seminary serving as its graduate theological school.

During World War II Erskine served as a cadet training school for the United States Army Air Corps. A substantial enrollment effort in the late 1950s brought Erskine’s undergraduate enrollment to over 700 students throughout the 1960s and into the 1970s. In 2014, Erskine celebrated 175 years as a Christian academic community, and in the 2022-23 school year, enrollment hit an all-time high of 830 undergraduate and 137 graduate seminary students. 

On March 11, 2014, a website article on Outsports detailed the coming out of two male players on the college's volleyball team. On February 27, 2015, Erskine College released a statement that students are expected to "follow the teachings of scripture concerning matters of human sexuality."

Academics
Erskine College offers Bachelor of Arts and Bachelor of Science degrees. Minors are offered in several other fields of study. A Christian Education concentration is offered within the Bible and Religion major and special minors are offered in Family Studies, Computer Science, Non-Western Studies, Theater, and Information Technology. The college also offers pre-professional programs in medicine, law, pharmacy, and dentistry. The student to faculty ratio is 15:1.

Erskine is accredited by the Southern Association of Colleges and Schools. It was placed on "Warning" status following its decennial accreditation review in December 2013. The college's status was reviewed in December 2014, and the sanction was then escalated to "Probation" status, due to continued failure to comply with accreditation standards related to fiscal stability and institutional effectiveness in student learning outcomes. SACSCOC removed all accreditation sanctions and reaffirmed Erskine's regional accreditation in December 2015.

Athletics
Erskine College teams participate as a member of the National Collegiate Athletic Association's Division II, Conference Carolinas.

Men's sports include baseball, basketball, cross country, football, golf, soccer, track and field, and volleyball; while women's sports include basketball, beach volleyball, cross country, golf, lacrosse, soccer, softball, tennis, track and field, and volleyball. Co-ed sports include bass fishing, e-sports, and rodeo. On September 25, 2019, Erskine Athletic Director Mark Peeler announced the addition of a Cheerleading and Dance program beginning in the 2020–2021 school year.

The Flying Fleet

Back in 1896, Erskine College began its first American football team. They had very successful seasons between 1917 and 1921. During those seasons they had wins against Wofford, Presbyterian, South Carolina, Clemson, and the Citadel. One of the memorable games of Erskine's football team was against Furman University. It was during that game in 1929 that Erskine took on the name "The Flying Fleet", given to them by a Greenville reporter who was impressed by their passing performance. On October 18, 1948, they defeated Florida State 14–6. The Flying Fleet ended their football program in 1951.

In 2018, Erskine College announced the return of the football program for the 2020 season competing as an Independent in NCAA Division II. In 2021, The Flying Fleet played its first football game in 70 years.

Major buildings
 Administrative offices: Belk Hall, Watkins Student Center
 Art buildings: Bowie Arts Center, Memorial Hall
 Classrooms: Belk Hall, Reid Hall, Daniel Moultrie Science Center (DMSC)
 Recreation: Galloway Center, the Hangar (under Lesesne Auditorium), pavilion, swimming pool, sand volleyball court
 Men's housing: Bonner Hall, Grier Hall, Kennedy Hall, McQuiston Hall (Honors Housing), Pressly Hall
 Women's housing: Carnegie Hall, Edwards House (Honors Housing), Robinson Hall
 Co-ed housing: Erskine Apartments, Fleet Village
 Dining services: Java City, Moffatt Dining Hall, Snappers
 Erskine Towers: Flagship Building, old astronomical observatory and clock tower
 Library: McCain Library, Reid Hall (archives)
 Literary Society Halls: Euphemian Hall, Philomathean Hall

Notable alumni

 Susan Audé – WIS-TV news anchor
 Erskine Caldwell – author (attended, but did not graduate)
 Rex L. Carter - American lawyer and politician
 Beth Couture – head coach of the Butler Bulldogs women's basketball team
 Lawrence Cowan – Arizona territorial, legislator, judge, lawyer, and business.
 Tom Ervin – member of the South Carolina House of Representatives
 Alphonza Gadsden – bishop of the Reformed Episcopal Church
 Thomas S. Gettys – U.S. Congressman from South Carolina
 Charles Haldeman - American novelist
 Joseph T. Johnson - U.S. Representative from South Carolina and U.S. district judge
 Ira B. Jones – former South Carolina Supreme Court Chief Justice and gubernatorial candidate
 Thomas G. Long – Bandy Professor of Preaching at Candler School of Theology at Emory University
 Benjamin Meek Miller – Governor of Alabama, 1931–1935
 William Bell Montgomery – founder of Southern Farm Gazette (now known as the Progressive Farmer) and Mississippi State University
 Eric Moody - professional baseball player
 Joseph Rodney Moss – former Associate Justice and Chief Justice on the South Carolina Supreme Court
 Champ Osteen - professional baseball player
 Lemuel P. Padgett – U.S. Congressman from Tennessee
 Garth Pollonais - professional soccer player
 Maynard Pittendreigh - astronomer, writer and an ordained minister in the Presbyterian Church (USA)
 Buck Pressly - professional baseball player
 Eleanor C. Pressly – aeronautical engineer at Goddard Space Flight Center
 Charles Bryson Simonton – U.S. Congressman from Tennessee
 W. Jasper Talbert - U.S. Congressman
 Eugene Van Taylor - professional soccer player
 Tom Verlaine – lead singer/guitarist of proto-punk rock band Television (attended, but did not graduate)
 Jay West - American politician
 H. Llyod Wilkerson – United States Marine Corps major general
 Li Zhengming - Chinese engineer and professor

See also
Due West Female College
Euphemian Literary Society
List of colleges and universities in South Carolina
Philomathean Literary Society (Erskine College)

Notes

References

External links
 
 Erskine College athletics website

 
Liberal arts colleges in South Carolina
Presbyterian universities and colleges in the United States
Educational institutions established in 1839
Universities and colleges accredited by the Southern Association of Colleges and Schools
Buildings and structures in Abbeville County, South Carolina
1839 establishments in South Carolina
Private universities and colleges in South Carolina